Oshikiri most commonly refers to:
 Moe Oshikiri, Japanese model and designer
 Toru Oshikiri, a fictional character created by Junji Ito
 Oshikiri (film)
 Oshikiri Station, a railway station in the city of Nagaoka, Niigata, Japan